Aleksei Andreyevich Alekseyev (born 12 June 1988) is a former Russian professional football player.

Club career
He played 3 seasons in the Russian Football National League for FC Baltika Kaliningrad.

External links
 
 
 
 

1988 births
Living people
Russian footballers
Association football forwards
FC Baltika Kaliningrad players
FK Ventspils players
Latvian Higher League players
Russian expatriate footballers
Expatriate footballers in Latvia
People from Krasnogorsk, Moscow Oblast
Sportspeople from Moscow Oblast